This is a list of best-selling albums in the Philippines. This list can contain any types of albums, including studio albums or extended plays, live albums, greatest hits or compilations, various artists, and soundtracks, both from domestic and international artists. The Philippine Association of the Record Industry (PARI) is the organization responsible for awarding record certifications in the Philippines. PARI is a member of the International Federation of the Phonographic Industry (IFPI). Album certifications include both physical and digital sales.

Music certifications prior to 1990 were only awarded by record labels of their artists through their own guidelines until PARI took the obligation. PARI's early policy at that time was that released albums in the country can only be certified Platinum if they were sold at least 40,000 copies, eventually they would receive Diamond award when they reach ten times, at 400,000. This rule was granted until 2006 when PARI changed it down to 30,000 units. It was not until October 2007 that thresholds for albums were distinguished between the local and international repertoire. In local release, PARI made it into 30,000 copies, same that of the previous rule, but parted away from the international release, decreased it into 20,000 copies. In February 2008, PARI again decided to change the guidelines. This time, they made 25,000 copies for local albums and 15,000 for international albums. This latter did not take until December 2009 when PARI decreased five-thousand copies for local albums for a requirement as a Platinum-certified album when they made it to 20,000, while still remained 15,000 for international-released albums, same from the previous one.

Currently, domestic repertoire again shares the same thresholds along with the international repertoire, same that of the 1999—2006/2007 rule. As the album could be one of the best-sellers, new criteria were told that the figure must be published by a reliable or acceptable source and that the album must have sold at least 150,000 units for both domestic and international albums in the country which was already implemented in March 2012. This is why only partial sales figures for international albums such as Fearless, All Saints, Nandito Ako, and The Fame have been included on this list. Mandy Moore album by Mandy Moore had sold 200,000 copies in the Philippines, making it the second Best-selling album in the Philippines by a female foreign singer behind Alanis Morisette's Jagged Little Pill. 

As of 2021, Jose Mari Chan's Constant Change (1989) and Christmas in Our Hearts (1990) still remain as the best-selling albums in the country with the estimated sales of more than 800,000 copies each. Regine Velasquez is considered as the best-selling artist of all time in the Philippines with 7 million certified albums locally and 1.5 million certified albums in Asia. Other artists such as Eraserheads and Rivermaya have three albums on the list, while Gary Valenciano, Jaya, Jolina Magdangal, Jose Mari Chan, MYMP, Smokey Mountain and Westlife each have two.

Best-selling albums

See also 

 Music in the Philippines
 Philippine Association of the Record Industry
 List of best-selling albums: by country, or worldwide

Notes

References

External links 
List of PARI Gold, Platinum & Diamond Awardees

Philippines